SoulTrap is an action-adventure videogame released in November 26, 1996 for the Windows 95 platform.

The plot centres on Malcolm West, an executive director who has suffered nightmares since childhood. The nightmares have now come back even worse and the only way to defeat his phobias is to fight his way through obstacles and mazes defeating various enemies to win back his soul.

Gameplay
The game (see SoulTrap demo http://www.fileplanet.com/11203/10000/fileinfo/Soultrap or  http://download.cnet.com/SoulTrap-demo/3000-7564_4-10004274.html) is a third-person action that requires the player to perform precise platforming and to shoot down baddies while also taking part in highly accurate jumping. The view (from the third to the first person perspective and back) can be changed anytime by pressing a single key. It comes in quite handy in certain places throughout the dangerous journey.

The game also features a quicksave option, making it a lot easier to complete specific sections that would otherwise could have been much more frustrating.

References

SoulTrap - PC Review - Coming Soon Magazine
Soul Trap review by Al Giovetti
Soultrap - FilePlanet
SoulTrap demo CNET Download.com

1997 video games
Action-adventure games
Science fiction video games
Video games developed in Canada
Windows games
Windows-only games